Paul Apted (9 February 1967 – 4 July 2014) was a British sound editor who worked on Alice in Wonderland (2010), The Wolverine (2013), The Book Thief (also 2013) and The Fault in Our Stars (2014).

The son of director Michael Apted and his first wife Jo Apted, he collaborated with his father on the films Nell (1994), Extreme Measures (1996) and The Chronicles of Narnia: The Voyage of the Dawn Treader (2010).

Apted died in Los Angeles on 4 July 2014 from colon cancer, aged 47.

He was survived by his wife Gemma Richardson, their daughter Rose, his son Thomas, mother Jo; father Michael, and siblings Jim, John and Lily.

References

External links 

1967 births
2014 deaths
Deaths from colorectal cancer
British film editors
Deaths from cancer in California
American film editors